Alpinumisoflavone is a pyranoisoflavone, a type of isoflavone. It can be found in the bark of Rinorea welwitschii. It can also be found in the molluscicide plant Millettia thonningii and is thought to be an antischistosomal agent since it has been shown to kill the snails which transmit the schistosomiasis and also the larvae of the parasite itself.

References 

Pyranoisoflavones